Malakhovsky Bor is a rural locality (a settlement) in Tarnogskoye Rural Settlement, Tarnogsky District, Vologda Oblast, Russia. The population was 13 as of 2002.

Geography 
Malakhovsky Bor is located 5 km west of Tarnogsky Gorodok (the district's administrative centre) by road. Igumnovskaya is the nearest rural locality.

References 

Rural localities in Tarnogsky District